The discography of American rapper Cormega, consists of eight studio albums, two compilation albums, one extended play, and 11 singles.

In 1996, Cormega was featured on the Nas song "Affirmative Action" alongside fellow rappers AZ and Foxy Brown. They together formed a rap group called The Firm. Because of his performance on the song, Cormega was signed to Def Jam Recordings and recorded his first studio album The Testament. However, he was replaced with Nature in The Firm and later released from Def Jam, indefinitely shelving The Testament.

He nevertheless released his debut studio album, The Realness through LandSpeed Records and his own imprint Legal Hustle Records. The album gained both critical and commercial success, peaking at number 111 on the U.S. Billboard 200. It was supported by two singles: "You Don't Want It" and "Get Out My Way". The following year, he released his next studio album, The True Meaning, to further success and acclaim, it became his highest charting entry on the U.S. Billboard 200, peaking at number 95 on the chart. It contained the singles "Built for This" and "The Come Up", the latter which featured Large Professor.

In 2004, he released his first compilation album, Legal Hustle. The Testament, originally recorded in the late 90s, was released as his third studio album in 2005. It was supported by one single, "One Love". In 2009, he released his fourth studio album Born and Raised via Aura Records. It included the single "Dirty Game". He released another compilation album, Raw Forever, in 2011.

In 2014, Cormega released his fifth studio album Mega Philosophy through Slimstyle Reocrds. In 2018, he released his first extended play, Mega.

Albums

Studio albums

Compilation albums

Collaboration albums

Soundtrack albums

Extended plays

Singles

References

Discographies of American artists